John Reid (born 20 August 1932) is a Scottish former professional footballer who played as an inside forward. Active in both Scotland and England, Reid made nearly 500 career league appearances between 1954 and 1968, scoring nearly 100 goals.

Career
Born in Newmains, Reid began his career with Kello Rovers. After turning professional in 1954, Reid played for Hamilton Academical, Bradford City, Northampton Town, Luton Town, Torquay United and Rochdale.

References

External links

1932 births
Living people
Scottish footballers
Kello Rovers F.C. players
Hamilton Academical F.C. players
Bradford City A.F.C. players
Northampton Town F.C. players
Luton Town F.C. players
Torquay United F.C. players
Rochdale A.F.C. players
Scottish Football League players
English Football League players
Association football forwards